Apetaenus is a genus of beach flies in the family Canacidae. They are endemic to the subantarctic archipelagos in association with colonies of penguins and other seabirds. Some species have vestigial wings.

Species
Subgenus Apetaenus Eaton, 1875
Apetaenus litoralis litoralis Eaton, 1875
Apetaenus litoralis marionensis Munari, 2008
Apetaenus litoralis watsoni Hardy, 1962
Subgenus Listriomastax Enderlein, 1909
Apetaenus enderleini Munari, 2007
Subgenus Macrocanace Tonnoir and Malloch, 1926
Apetaenus australis (Hutton, 1902)
Apetaenus littoreus (Hutton, 1902)

References

Canacidae
Schizophora genera